Istifanus Gyang (born 1964) is a Nigerian senator who is representing Plateau North Senatorial District in the 9th National Assembly. He is an indigene of Plateau state.

Background 
Gyang attended Government Secondary School, Riyom where he obtained his West African School Certificate (WASC) in 1981. He furthered his education at the Ahmadu Bello University, Zaria where he was awarded a bachelor's degree in International Studies in 1986. He also attended the University of Jos finishing with a second degree in law in 2004. He was called to the Nigerian bar in 2007.

Political career 
In 2015, Gyang contested for a seat in the House of Representatives for the Barkin Ladi/Riyom constituency. He was declared winner under the banner of the PDP (Peoples Democratic Party). In 2019, he contested for a seat in the Senate under the People's Democratic Party (PDP) representing Plateau North senatorial district and he currently serves as a senator in the 9th National Assembly.

References 

Living people
Place of birth missing (living people)
21st-century Nigerian lawyers
21st-century Nigerian politicians
All Progressives Congress politicians
Peoples Democratic Party members of the Senate (Nigeria)
People from Plateau State
Ahmadu Bello University alumni
1964 births
Members of the National Assembly (Nigeria)